Kenefick Park is located at 100 Bancroft Street in South Omaha, Nebraska, next to the Lauritzen Gardens, Omaha's botanical gardens. Kenefick Park features "two of the greatest locomotives ever to power Union Pacific Railroad": EMD DDA40X #6900,the first of the class, and Union Pacific Big Boy #4023.

About
Sitting at the southwest point of the Lauritzen Gardens property along Interstate 80, the park welcomes motorists to Nebraska. It features a display of Union Pacific Big Boy #4023 and Union Pacific Centennial #6900 locomotives.

Kenefick Park was relocated in 2004 from Abbott Drive north of downtown to its current location in order to accommodate the CenturyLink Center Omaha. It is named in honor of former Union Pacific Chairman and CEO John Kenefick.

See also
 Parks in Omaha

References

Parks in Omaha, Nebraska
Union Pacific Railroad
Landmarks in South Omaha, Nebraska
1891 establishments in Nebraska